Heungcheonsa is a Buddhist temple of the Jogye Order in Seoul, South Korea. It is located at 592 Donam-dong, in the Seongbuk-gu  area of the city.

See also
List of Buddhist temples in Seoul

External links
www.encyber.com

Buddhist temples in Seoul
Seongbuk District
Buddhist temples of the Jogye Order